The Americas Zone is one of the three zones of regional Davis Cup competition in 2011.

In the Americas Zone there are four different groups in which teams compete against each other to advance to the next group.

Participating teams

Seeds:
 
 

Remaining nations:

Draw

 relegated to Group II in 2012.
 and  advance to World Group play-off.

First Round matches

Mexico vs. Canada

Uruguay vs. Colombia

Second Round matches

Ecuador vs. Canada

Uruguay vs. Brazil

First-round play-offs

Ecuador vs. Mexico

Second-round play-offs

Mexico vs. Colombia

References

External links
 Davis Cup draw details

Americas Zone Group I
Davis Cup Americas Zone

nl:Davis Cup 2011 Amerikaanse zone